Bimboland is a 1998 French comedy film directed by Ariel Zeitoun and written by Roselyne Bosch. The film stars Judith Godrèche, Aure Atika, Gérard Depardieu, Sophie Forte, Armelle and Dany Boon. The film was released on December 23, 1998, by Gaumont Buena Vista International.

Plot

Cast       
Judith Godrèche as Cécile Bussy
Aure Atika as Alex Baretto
Gérard Depardieu as Laurent Gaspard 
Sophie Forte as Karène Leblond
Armelle as Nathalie
Dany Boon as Greg 
Amanda Lear as Gina
Laëtitia Lacroix as Sandra 
Thiam Aïssatou as Ludmilla 
Saskia Mulder as Vanessa
Évelyne Buyle as Gaëlle Bussy
Valerie Barriere as Sonia
Monique Letitre as Elisabeth
Denis Braccini as Videur boîte de nuit
Magali Farrugia as Magali
Michel Modo as Aristide Roumestan

References

External links
 

1998 films
1990s French-language films
French comedy films
1998 comedy films
Gaumont Film Company films
Films directed by Ariel Zeitoun
1990s French films